Neptuniibacter halophilus is a Gram-negative, aerobic, rod-shaped and motile bacterium from the genus of Neptuniibacter which has been isolated from a salt pan in Taiwan.

References

External links
Type strain of Neptuniibacter halophilus at BacDive -  the Bacterial Diversity Metadatabase

Oceanospirillales
Bacteria described in 2012